Melchior of Brunswick-Grubenhagen (died 1381 or 1384) was a German aristocrat, prince-bishop of Osnabrück from 1369, and then prince-bishop of Schwerin from 1376 to 1381.

He was the son of Henry II, Duke of Brunswick-Grubenhagen.

Notes

External links
At the peerage.com
 

Roman Catholic Prince-Bishops of Osnabrück
Old House of Brunswick
Roman Catholic Prince-Bishops of Schwerin
14th-century German Roman Catholic bishops
Sons of monarchs